A by-election was held for the Australian House of Representatives seat of Batman on 8 February 1911. This was triggered by the death of Labour MP Henry Beard.

The by-election was won by Labour candidate Frank Brennan.

Results

References

1911 elections in Australia
Victorian federal by-elections
1910s in Melbourne